Magnolia is an unincorporated community in Johnson County, in the U.S. state of Missouri.

History
Magnolia was platted in 1896, and named the flowering plant magnolia. A post office called Magnolia was established in 1896, and remained in operation until 1953.

References

Unincorporated communities in Johnson County, Missouri
Unincorporated communities in Missouri